The siege of Acre (also called the fall of Acre) took place in 1291 and resulted in the Crusaders losing control of Acre to the Mamluks. It is considered one of the most important battles of the period. Although the crusading movement continued for several more centuries, the capture of the city marked the end of further crusades to the Levant. When Acre fell, the Crusaders lost their last major stronghold of the Crusader Kingdom of Jerusalem.  They still maintained a fortress at the northern city of Tartus (today in north-western Syria), engaged in some coastal raids, and attempted an incursion from the tiny island of Ruad, but when they lost that as well in 1302 in the siege of Ruad, the Crusaders no longer controlled any part of the Holy Land.

Background

In 1187, Saladin conquered much of the Kingdom of Jerusalem (also called the Latin Kingdom), including Acre and Jerusalem, after winning the Battle of Hattin and inflicting heavy losses on the Crusaders. The Third Crusade was launched in response; the Crusaders besieged and eventually recaptured Acre in 1191. Acre became the capital of the Kingdom of Jerusalem. The religious orders made their headquarters in and around the city, and from there made crucial military and diplomatic decisions. For example, when the Mongols arrived from the East in the mid-13th century, the Christians saw them as potential allies while also maintaining a cautious neutrality with the Muslim Mamluks. In 1260, the Barons of Acre granted the Mamluks safe passage through the Latin Kingdom en route to fighting the Mongols; the Mamluks subsequently won the pivotal Battle of Ain Jalut in Galilee against the Mongols. This was an example of atypically cordial relations between the Christians and the Mamluks.

In 1250, the Mamluk Sultanate arose in Egypt; it was a more dangerous enemy than the Ayyubids. The Mamluks fielded heavy cavalry – a match for the Crusader knights – and was much more hostile. As early as 1261, after the Battle of Ain Jalut, Sultan Baibars led the Mamluks against the Crusaders. Baibars captured Caesarea, Haifa, and Arsuf in 1265, all the important Crusader holdings in Galilee the following year, and then Antioch in 1268.

Europe launched a number of minor Crusading expeditions to reinforce the Crusader states, including the abortive Crusade of Louis IX of France to Tunis in 1270, and the minor Ninth Crusade of Prince Edward (later King Edward I) of England in 1271–1272. The expeditions failed to provide the required relief; they were too small, too short-lived, and the interests of the participants were too diverse.

More seriously, no major reinforcing Crusade was forthcoming. Pope Gregory X was unable to rally support for another great Crusade. Papal advisors blamed the lack of enthusiasm to the laziness and vice of the European nobility and to clerical corruption. A more fundamental reason seems to have been the debasement of Crusading ideal; Gregory X's predecessors had used Crusades to raise armies against the Papacy's European enemies.

The Crusader states continued to deteriorate from continuing attacks and political instability. In 1276, the unpopular "King of Jerusalem" Hugh III moved his court to Cyprus. Under Sultan Al-Mansur Qalawun, the Mamluks captured Lattakia in 1278, and conquered the County of Tripoli in 1289. Qalawun concluded a ten-year truce with the Kingdom of Jerusalem in 1284.

Following the fall of Tripoli, King Henry II, son of Hugh III, sent seneschal Jean de Grailly to warn European monarchs of the critical situation in the Levant. Pope Nicholas IV supported Jean by writing letters urging European potentates to act. However, the Sicilian question overshadowed calls for a new Crusade, and Edward I of England was too entangled by troubles at home.

Decades of communications between the Europeans and the Mongols failed to secure a meaningful Franco-Mongol alliance.

Pretext for attack
One Arabian account claims that an affair between a rich young wife of the city and a Mussulman was discovered by the husband who:

The Crusaders feared that Qalawun would use this as a pretext to resume the war, and petitioned the pontiff for reinforcements. According to Michaud, 25 Venetian galleys carrying 1600 men "levied in haste in Italy" were sent. Other sources claim 20 galleys of peasants and unemployed townfolks from Tuscany and Lombardy, led by Nicholas Tiepolo, the son of Doge Lorenzo Tiepolo, who was assisted by the returning Jean de Grailly and Roux of Sully. These were joined by five galleys from King James II of Aragon who wished to help despite his conflict with the Pope and Venice.

The Italian reinforcements were ill-disciplined and without regular pay; they pillaged indiscriminately from both Muslims and Christians before setting out from Acre. According to Runciman they attacked and killed some Muslim merchants around Acre in August 1290, although in Michaud's account they instead pillaged and massacred towns and villages. Qalawun demanded the extradition of the Christian perpetrators. On the suggestion of Guillaume de Beaujeu, the Grand Master of the Knights Templar, the Council of Acre debated the issue; the Sultan's demand was rejected, with the Crusaders claiming that the murdered Muslims had been responsible for their own deaths.

Siege

Prelude to battle
Sultan Qalawun dissolved the truce with Acre and the Mamluks began mobilizing by October 1290. Qalawun died in December and was succeeded by his son, Al-Ashraf Khalil (sometimes spelled Chalil.) Guillaume de Beaujeu received a message from Khalil, which stated the latter's intention to attack Acre and to refuse peace overtures. Nonetheless, the Crusaders dispatched a peace delegation, led by Sir Philip Mainebeuf, to Cairo; the delegation was imprisoned. Khalil set out from Cairo in March 1291.

The assembled Mamluk army greatly outnumbered the Crusaders. Khalil called upon Syria to reinforce his Egyptian army; he was answered by contingents from Damascus (led by Lajin), Hama (led by al-Muzaffar Taqai ad-Din), Tripoli (led by Bilban) and Al-Karak (led by Baibars al-Dewadar.) A significant portion of the troops were volunteers. The army included a substantial artillery train drawn from fortresses across the Mamluk empire. Hama sent the enormous catapult "The Victorious" (.) Another large catapult was "The Furious" (.) There were also lighter mangonels called "Black Bulls" (.).

Notable historians in the Mamluks ranks included Baibars al-Dewadar, and Abu al-Fida in the Haman contingent.

The Crusaders appeals for aid met with little success. England sent a few knights, including Otto de Grandson of Savoy. The only noteworthy reinforcements came from Henry II of Cyprus, who fortified the walls and sent troops led by his brother Amalric. Burchard von Schwanden suddenly resigned as Grand Master of the Teutonic Order and left Acre for Europe; he was succeeded by Konrad von Feuchtwangen. The only major contingent to leave were the Genoese, who concluded a separate treaty with Khalil. Many women and children were evacuated from Acre to Cyprus in March.

Acre was defended by an inner and outer wall, with a total of twelve towers built by European kings and rich pilgrims.

The siege begins

Sultan Khalil and the Egyptian army arrived at Acre on 6 April 1291, with the Syrian contingents arriving two days later with siege engines. The Mamluk encampment spanned from one coast to the other about two kilometres from the city walls. The red dihliz – the Sultan's personal tent and headquarters – was on a small hill west of the Legate's Tower. There was little fighting during the first eight days as the besiegers established their camp. From days nine to eleven the Mamluks pushed forward barricades and wicker screens until they reached the fosse before the outer wall; Carabohas, rapid-fire siege engines, were brought up. The besiegers began mining and bombarding the walls. Acre's gates remained open – but heavily defended – as sally ports.

The Crusaders launched multiple attacks on the Mamluk camp. An amphibious assault on the Hamans – stationed on the northernmost section of the line by the sea – was successful although the Crusaders suffered heavy casualties. In another raid, three hundred Templar, led by Jean de Grailly and Otto de Grandson, rode out under moonlight to attack Haman artillery with Greek fire; while the artillery was not destroyed, the Templar engaged over 1000 Mamluks and returned with trophies and captured supplies. Khalil punished some subordinates for the humiliation caused by the Templar. In general, Crusader attacks failed to disrupt Mamluk preparations for a direct assault on the walls.

Henry II of Cyprus arrived on 4 May with reinforcements of 700 troops aboard 40 ships. The king's arrival temporarily buoyed morale, but an inspection of the city convinced Henry II to attempt a negotiated settlement; the Crusaders believed that tribute could buy a truce. On 17 May, William of Villiers, a knight, and William of Caffran, of Guillaume de Beaujeu's household, were sent to negotiate with the Sultan. The negotiations were unsuccessful. The Crusaders refused to surrender, and appealed to Khalil to lift the siege and accept peace for the sake of the civilian inhabitants. Khalil remained intent on conquering the city, perhaps encouraged by the popularity of the cause among his troops; his counteroffer to allow the defenders to surrender and leave with their lives and property was rejected. Toward the end of the meeting, a Crusader artillery stone landed near the dihliz; the Sultan was greatly angered and ordered a full assault the following day. The messengers returned to the city unharmed.

The Mamluk assault was preceded by weeks of preparation. By 18 May, multiple towers and parts of the wall were collapsed by undermining, and sections of the fosse filled in. The collapse of the Tower of the King was particularly demoralizing among the defenders, and the evacuation of women and children accelerated.

Storming the city

The Mamluk army assembled before dawn on 18 May and attacked the entire length of the wall to the sound of trumpets and drums carried on 300 camels. The Mamluks poured through the breaches; by 9a.m. the outcome seems to have been beyond doubt. The Mamluks captured the Accursed Tower on the inner wall and forced the Crusaders to retreat to the Gate of St. Anthony. Guillaume de Beaujeu was mortally wounded defending the Gate of St. Anthony. On the Montmusard walls, the Lazarists remained while the Templars and Hospitallers made a failed attempt to retake the Accursed Tower. The redeployment allowed the Hamans to break through the Montmusard walls and kill the Lazarists. The Mamluks gained more penetrations as the Crusaders abandoned the walls.

The Mamluks pushed into the city, looting and massacring any they encountered. Organized Crusader resistance collapsed, and the retreat to the harbour and the ships was chaotic; wealthy refugees offered exorbitant sums for safe passage. Henry II and Jean de Villiers, Grand Master of the Knights Hospitaller, were among those evacuated. The evacuation was made more difficult by the poor weather.

Acre falls

By the night of 18 May, Acre was in Mamluk hands, except for the seaside Templar fortress at the western tip of city. The fortress contained four towers, and within were remnants of the Templar, Hospitallers, and Teutonic Knights, and thousands of civilians. The fortress held out for ten more days, during which Matthew of Clermont, a Hospitaller marshal, was killed. On 20 May, the tower held by the Templar, led by Peter de Severy, asked for amnesty. Sultan Khalil agreed to allow the Templars to leave without weapons to Cyprus. The agreement collapsed when the Mamluks supervising the evacuation inside the fortress were killed by the Templars. Templar Thibaud Gaudin and a few others left the fortress under the cover of darkness, taking the Templar treasury with them to Sidon. According to a contemporary Mamluk account, Khalil sent Emir Kitbugha al-Mansuri to offer amnesty to the Crusaders. The Teutonic Knights accepted and surrendered their tower after being allowed to leave with their women, but al-Mansuri was killed by other Crusaders. On 21 May, de Severy and a small delegation left the fortress to resume negotiations and were executed, possibly in reprisal for the death of al-Mansuri. Further offers of amnesty were rejected by the Crusaders. On 28 May, the final tower surrendered; Mamluk mines were prepared to destroy the tower making further resistance useless. The tower collapsed after prisoners and booty had been removed; according to Mamluk accounts, a few sightseers and looters were killed. 

News of Mamluk victory caused celebrations in Damascus and Cairo. In Damascus, Khalil entered the city with chained Crusader prisoners and captured Crusader standards – carried upside-down in defeat. The Sultan returned to Cairo with the gate of the Church of Saint Andrew from Acre, which was used to construct a mosque and released Philip Mainebeuf's delegation. Furthermore, celebrations were described as:
“The entire city had been decorated, and sheets of satin had been laid along his triumphal path through the city leading to the palace of the governor. The regal sultan was proceeded by 280 fettered prisoners. One bore a reversed Frankish banner; another carried a banner and spear from which the hair of slain comrades was suspended. Al-Ashraf was greeted by the whole population of Damascus and the surrounding countryside lining the route, ulama [legal scholars], mosque officials, Sufi sheiks, Christians and Jews, all holding candles even though the parade took place before noon.”

Aftermath

The fall of Acre signaled the end of the Jerusalem crusades. No effective crusade was raised to recapture the Holy Land afterwards, though talk of further crusades was common enough. By 1291, other ideals had captured the interest and enthusiasm of the monarchs and nobility of Europe and even strenuous papal efforts to raise expeditions to retake the Holy Land met with little response.

The Latin Kingdom continued to exist, theoretically, on the island of Cyprus. There the Latin kings planned to recapture the mainland, but in vain. Money, men, and the will to do the task were all lacking. One last effort was made by King Peter I in 1365, when he successfully landed in Egypt and sacked Alexandria. Once the city was taken, however, the Crusaders returned to Cyprus. As a crusade, the episode was futile, and this and further coastal raids over the following decades led in 1410–11 to a destructive counter-raid by the Mamelukes; in 1426 Cyprus was forced into Mameluke vassalship with a hefty yearly tribute.

The 14th century saw some other crusades organized, but these enterprises differed in many ways from the 11th- and 12th-century expeditions which are properly called Crusades. The crusades of the 14th century aimed not at the recapture of Jerusalem and the Christian shrines of the Holy Land, but rather at checking the advance of the Ottoman Turks into Europe. While many of the crusaders in these 14th-century undertakings looked upon the defeat of the Ottomans as a preliminary to the ultimate recapture of the Holy Land, none of the later crusades attempted any direct attack upon Palestine or Syria.

Historiography
Two short works dedicated to the siege were produced by contemporaries on the basis of eyewitness accounts: the Hystoria de desolacione of Thaddeus of Naples and the anonymous Excidium Acconis. These survive in four and six manuscripts, respectively. The Gestes des Chiprois, written a generation later and surviving in a single manuscript, is the other main source from the crusaders' perspective.

Notes

References

Bibliography

Further reading
 Antonio Musarra, Acri 1291. La caduta degli stati crociati, Bologna, il Mulino, 2017.
 Siege of Acre 1291
 The history of the crusades, Volume 3, pp 70–89 (Google Books, full view), by Joseph François Michaud, trans. William Robson. Note that in this account Acre is referred to as "Ptolemaïs", Sultan Qalawun as "Kalouan" and Khalil as "Chalil" and throughout the work Muslims are referred to as "Mussulmans". Several contemporary manuscripts, such as the chronicles of Ibn Ferat, are referenced and appendices give some translations.
 The Crusades by Edward Gibbon (1963), pp. 76–78, provides a useful short summary of the events of the siege including an overview of the situation in Acre at the time.

Acre (1291)
Conflicts in 1291
Acre, Israel
1291 in Asia
Acre 1291
Acre 1291
Acre 1291
Acre 1291
Acre
Military history of the Crusader states after Lord Edward's crusade